Lac d'Aygue Rouye is a lake in Hautes-Pyrénées, France. At an elevation of 1595 m, its surface area is 0.01 km².

Lakes of Hautes-Pyrénées